Hayley Chase  is an American actress, known for her many dramatic roles such as, Grey's Anatomy, Hawaii Five-0, NCIS, CSI: Miami, Criminal Minds and comedic guest starring roles on television as well as her recurring role as Joannie Palumbo on Hannah Montana. She has starred in numerous television ads such as Yoplait and AT&T.

Filmography

Film

Television

References

External links

American child actresses
American film actresses
American television actresses
21st-century American actresses
Living people
Place of birth missing (living people)